Outbound refers to a direction of trains, other transport, or roads that travel away from the city center. It may also refer to:


Arts, entertainment, and media

Music
Outbound (Béla Fleck and the Flecktones album), 2000
Outbound (Christian Bautista album)
Outbound (Keldian album), an album by symphonic power metal band Keldian
Outbound (Stuart Hamm album)

Other arts, entertainment, and media
Outbound (film), a Romanian film

Brands and enterprises
Outbound Systems, manufacturer of the Outbound Laptop, an early Apple Macintosh compatible laptop computer
Rans S-21 Outbound, an American kit aircraft design

See also
Outward Bound (disambiguation)